Rainbow Ski Area is a ski resort in New Zealand's South Island. Located close to Saint Arnaud, the ski field is just across the regional boundary in Marlborough District.

It opens from late June to early October. The lifted area covers an elevation range of 1540 to 1768 metres, and it caters primarily for skiers of intermediate ability, citing a distribution of 25% beginner, 55% intermediate and 20% advanced level.

There is no accommodation on the field, but it is linked by shuttle to Saint Arnaud, 35 minutes away.

Climate
The climate of Rainbow Ski Area falls under the Köppen-Geiger climate classification of Cfc (Sub-polar oceanic). The summers are cool, with an average February daily high of 14.5°C (58.1°F), even during this season overnight temperatures can go below freezing point. Winters are chilly, with the average low temperature in July reaching −6.2°C (20.8°F). Some days in winter are cold enough that they fail to reach 0°C (32°F). The annual average temperature in the Rainbow Ski Area is 4°C (39.2°F).

References

External links
 

Ski areas and resorts in New Zealand
Sport in the Tasman District
Tourist attractions in the Tasman District